Arrow to the Sun is a 1973 short film and a 1974 book, both by Gerald McDermott. The book was printed in gouache and ink, and it won the 1975 Caldecott Medal for illustration. Both media are a retelling of a Pueblo tale, specifically an Acoma Pueblo tale, in which a mysterious boy seeks his father.  In retelling the tale, some folklore scholars believe that the story has digressed from the spirit of the Acoma tradition.

Plot
Long ago, the Lord of the Sun shoots down the spark of life into the Pueblo, where it reaches a young woman and causes her to give birth to an unnamed son, referred to as "the Boy". When the Boy reaches adolescence, he is ridiculed by the other boys because he has no father. Disheartened, the Boy decides to leave the Pueblo and find his father.

During his journey, the Boy asks the assistance of both a farmer and a sculptress, but both refuse. However, when the Boy asks an elderly arrowsmith, the arrowsmith senses his relation to the Sun and agrees to lend aid. The arrowsmith transforms the Boy into an arrow and launches him to the Sun.

Arriving in the Sun, the boy encounters his father, the Lord, who is skeptical of the Boy's identity as his son. To confirm the Boy's identity, he challenges his son to complete four trials: the Kiva of Lions, the Kiva of Serpents, the Kiva of Bees, and the Kiva of Lightning; the boy emerges from the Kiva of Lightning with newfound powers stemming from the Sun.

After the Boy endures these trials, the Lord finally acknowledges him as his son, and he sends the Boy back to Earth to bring the Sun's spirit into the world of men. The denizens of the Pueblo welcome the Boy home with the Dance of Life to commemorate his return.

References

External links

1973 films
1973 short films
1974 children's books
Caldecott Medal–winning works
Films based on children's books
Viking Press books
American picture books